Alfa was an Italian brand of cigarettes, owned by multinational British American Tobacco. The brand was manufactured by its local subsidiary, BAT Italia, until it was discontinued in 2014. In Japan, Alfa is still being manufactured by Japan Tobacco.

History

Alfa was launched in the 1940s by Ente Tabacchi Italiani. Generally considered by many Italians as the worst Italian cigarettes available at the time, Alfa had a dark and low-quality tobacco, in which it was not so rare to find dust and pieces of wood in the tobacco. Very high in tar, Alfa cigarettes were appreciated by those smokers who looked for a tasty cigarette at a low price. In the period in which "Nazionali Semplici" ("Nationals without filter") were difficult to find as part of the "Mobile Scale Basket" established by the Italian government, Alfa was a very popular alternative, even if of lower quality. The golden lion with the shield, introduced at the end of the 1970s to gradually substitute the well-known sailing ship, represents the old symbol of the Italian "Monopoli di Stato" ("State Monopoly"), the national tobacco industry. The white triangle on the red background with the red Greek "Alfa" ("Alpha") painted on a white package was the brand's symbol in the 1970s. As it happened to similar brands like Super and Nazionali, Alfa packs are not available anymore in the short size. From the 1990s onwards, they have been substituted by a long King Size pack.

In March 1991, La Repubblica reported that the tar and nicotine content of Italian cigarette brands (Alfa included) were to be lowered by the Italian government. From 31 December 1992, onwards, cigarettes could no longer contain more than 15 mg of tar. The amount of tar would be lowered once again to 12 mg from 31 December 1997, onwards. At the time, Alfa cigarettes contained 18 mg of tar.

In 2003, the Italian Ministry of Economy and Finance published a list of all the cigarette brands that had to lower their tar and nicotine content. The Alfa brand had to lower its tar and nicotine levels from 11.5 mg tar and 0,95 mg nicotine in 2002 to 10.0 mg tar and 0,90 mg nicotine in 2003.

In 2014, the Alfa brand was discontinued.

Markets
Historically, Alfa was mainly sold in Italy, but was and in many cases is still is sold in countries such as, Switzerland, Bosnia and Herzegovina, Bulgaria, Ukraine and Japan.

See also

 Tobacco smoking

References

1940s establishments in Italy
2014 disestablishments in Italy
British American Tobacco brands
Japan Tobacco brands